Sympa is a Mailing list management (MLM) software. Its name, which is an acronym for Système de Multi-Postage Automatique (i.e. Automatic Mailing System), also means "nice" (friendly) in French.

Sympa is free and open-source software subject to the terms of the GNU General Public License (GPL).

Features
Sympa's features include bulk mailing, service messages and web pages defined by templates, subscriber information stored in a RDBMS, and an external antivirus plugin. Its web front-end offers a portal-like interface where the user can control all their list subscriptions and administrative powers in one place (i.e. one site per user, while Mailman (prior to 3.0), for example, creates one site per list).

Data is stored in a relational database such as MySQL, PostgreSQL, or Oracle; some configuration data is still held in text files, but the stated goal of the developers is to eventually hold as much configuration data as possible in the database as well.

Sympa consists of at least five concurrent daemons communicating through the database or by placing files in spools: a main daemon accepting incoming mail and controlling the other processes, a bounce daemon managing incoming bounces, an archiver archiving outgoing mail, a task manager doing scheduled maintenance and a bulk mailer doing the actual distributing of list messages to their recipients. The work of the main daemon can be split up into up to three parallel instances; of the bulk mailer, an arbitrary number of instances may be run in parallel. At least in theory, the bulk mailer processes can even be spread across a cluster of hosts. This architecture, combined with the use of a database table for buffering outgoing mail, makes Sympa well-suited for large and very large list environments handling millions of subscribers.

Other features are: (a full list of features is available on the Sympa web site.)
 high performance for huge lists ( > 700.000 subscribers)
 MIME-compatible
 data provisioning using LDAP, SQL or other data sources
 various authentication method (SSO, LDAP, X.509)
 benefit of S/MIME and DKIM
 internationalized
 web archive with access control, message removal, etc.
 multi-domain server designed for service providers.
 sophisticated automatic bounce management
 automatic service message and web interface customizable
 SOAP interface for integration with other applications

History
Sympa development started in 1995 and was first released in 1997. Its initial goal was to ensure continuity with the TULP list manager, produced partly by the initial author of Sympa, Christophe Wolfhugel. The initial version of Sympa included authentication, flexible command management, high performance in internal data access, and object-oriented code for easy code maintenance.

Since 2011, Sympa development has been handled by RENATER.

Since 2017, Sympa development has been handled by The Sympa Community.

Adoption
Among the customers adopting Sympa are the Scottish universities of Edinburgh and Glasgow.

See also

 List of mailing list software
 Distribution list
 Electronic mailing list

References

External links
 

Free mailing list software
Free email software
Mailing list software for Linux
Free software programmed in Perl
Email marketing software